Brayan Moreno Álvarez (born 2 August 1999) is a Colombian professional footballer who plays as a forward for CSKA Sofia.

He transferred to CSKA Sofia during the winter of 2022. Being injured when he came to Bulgaria, his debut was delayed. After making his debut, he was omitted from the matchday squad for yet another period. He started the 2022–23 campaign with 2 goals in July.

Career statistics

Club
As of 14 March 2023

References

External link 

1999 births
Living people
Colombian footballers
Atlético Huila footballers
PFC CSKA Sofia players
Colombian expatriate footballers
Expatriate footballers in Bulgaria
Colombian expatriate sportspeople in Bulgaria
Categoría Primera A players
Categoría Primera B players
First Professional Football League (Bulgaria) players